Clube Náutico Capibaribe, or simply Náutico, is a Brazilian multi-sport club based in Recife, Pernambuco. The club is most notable for its association football team, that plays in the Série C, the third tier of the Brazilian football league system, as well as in the Campeonato Pernambucano, the top division in the Pernambucano state football league system.

The origins of Náutico may be traced to the foundation of the Clube Náutico do Recife by a group of rowers ("Náutico" can be directly translated to "nautical") in 1898, but the official founding date is April 7 of 1901. Its first football team dates back to 1905, with a squad formed by Englishmen and Germans.

Náutico is the only football club in Pernambuco that has won the state championship 6 times in a row (from 1963 to 1968). The club has a historical rivalry with local clubs Sport Recife and Santa Cruz.

Náutico has an important swimming arena, including an Olympic-sized pool that meets all world standards. It also has activities in other sports including hockey, basketball, volleyball, handball, women's football, futsal, Brazilian jiu-jitsu, Boxing, Taekwondo, kendo, Muay Thai, MMA and the founding sport of the club, rowing. The official mascot of Náutico is the opossum, known locally as the "timbu".

Náutico has the 6th-largest core of fans in the Northeastern region of Brazil, and occupies the 21st place in the overall Brazilian ranking. In total, there were approximately 1.5 million Náutico fans in 2010, as showed by a Lance magazine and IBOPE research.

Stadium

Náutico's stadium is the Estádio Eládio de Barros Carvalho, popularly known as the Estádio dos Aflitos, inaugurated on June 25, 1939. It was the first stadium in Pernambuco state, with a maximum capacity of 19,800 people.
The stadium is named after Eládio de Barros Carvalho, who had fourteen spells as Naútico's president. Aflitos is so nicknamed because it is located in the Nossa Senhora dos Aflitos neighborhood.

First game (25/06/1939): Naútico 5–2 Sport Recife
First goal (25/06/1939): Wilson (Náutico)
Largest attendance (21/07/1968): Náutico 1–0 Sport Recife (31,061 spectators)
Biggest score (01/07/1945): Náutico 21–3 Flamengo of Pernambuco
Capacity: 19,800 seated spectators

Starting in July 2013 Náutico will be playing their home matches in Arena Pernambuco. Arena Pernambuco is a new stadium under construction in the western suburbs of Recife and was originally being constructed for the 2014 World Cup. Having outgrown their current capacity at Estádio dos Aflitos and unable to expand the stadium further, Náutico signed into agreement to purchase the new Arena Pernambuco. Five World Cup 2014 matches will be held at the new stadium along with Náutico's home matches.

Rivalry
Náutico's greatest rivalry is with Sport Recife, and their derbies are known as the Clássico dos Clássicos ("The Derby of the Derbies", in Portuguese). It is one of the oldest derbies in Brazilian football (Third - 1909). Sport Club do Recife was formed from a dissident group from the then elitist Náutico. Because of this, the derby has complex social implications that continue today.

Náutico's other local rival is Santa Cruz (1918). The rivalry between the two clubs is known as the Clássico das Emoções ("The Derby of the Emotions").

National Ranking
Position: 22nd
Pontuation: 8.036 points

Every year CBF publish the Brazilian National Ranking on December. This ranking only includes National tournaments (it excludes State, Regional, and International tournaments) between 1959 and 2012 (since 2012, it will account for just the last 5 seasons).

Sponsors
 Brahma (Beer maker)
 EMS (Pharmaceutical Company in Brazil)
BetNacional(Brazilian Bet)

Honours

National
 Campeonato Brasileiro Série C
 Winners (1): 2019

State
 Campeonato Pernambucano
 Winners (24): 1934, 1939, 1945, 1950, 1951, 1952, 1954, 1960, 1963, 1964,1965, 1966, 1967, 1968, 1974, 1984, 1985, 1989, 2001, 2002, 2004, 2018, 2021, 2022

Statistics

*Yellow Mode of Copa União.

Current squad

Current staff

Top goalscorers

Top goalscorers in the Campeonato Pernambucano

Top Náutico goalscorers in the Náutico-Santa Cruz derby (O Clássico das Emoções)

Top Náutico goalscorers in the Náutico-Sport derby (O Clássico dos Clássicos)

Top Appearances - All Competitions

Managers

 H. Cabelli (1929–30), (1934–35), (1938–40), (1941)
 Aurélio Munt (1945–47)
 Humberto Cabelli (1949)
 Sylvio Pirillo (1955)
 Ricardo Diéz (1957)
 Antoninho (1965)
 Paulinho de Almeida (1969)
 Sylvio Pirillo (1970)
 Antoninho (1971)
 Orlando Fantoni (1974–75)
 Ênio Andrade (1975)
 Danilo Alvim (1978)
 Paulo Emilio (1981)
 Pepe (1982)
 Ênio Andrade (1984)
 Paulo César Carpegiani (1986)
 Barbatana (1987)
 Carlos Alberto Torres (1987–88)
 Valmir Louruz (1988)
 Paulo César Carpegiani (1989)
 Roberto Oliveira (1989)
 Gílson Nunes (1991)
 Zé Mário (1992)
 Mário Juliato (1992)
 Hélio dos Anjos (1993)
 Gílson Nunes (1994)
 Mário Juliato (1994)
 Artur Neto (1998–99)
 Mauro Fernandes (2000)
 Estevam Soares (2001)
 Muricy Ramalho (May 5, 2001 – Oct 12, 2002)
 Vágner Benazzi (2002)
 Givanildo Oliveira (2002–03)
 Heriberto da Cunha (March 20, 2003 – Aug 3, 2003)
 Edson Gaúcho (Aug 4, 2003 – Sept 7, 2003)
 Zé Teodoro (2004)
 Mauro Galvão (2005)
 Roberto Cavalo (Feb 5, 2006 – May 15, 2006)
 Paulo Campos (May 15, 2006 – Nov 29, 2006)
 Hélio dos Anjos (Oct 15, 2006 – March 8, 2007)
 Paulo César Gusmão (March 9, 2007 – June 29, 2007)
 Roberto Fernandes (July 1, 2007 – May 19, 2008)
 Sangaletti (May 21, 2008 – May 25, 2008)
 Leandro Machado (May 25, 2008 – July 14, 2008)
 Pintado (July 16, 2008 – Aug 7, 2008)
 Roberto Fernandes (Aug 7, 2008 – March 6, 2009)
 Waldemar Lemos (March 29, 2009 – June 10, 2009)
 Márcio Bittencourt (June 11, 2009 – July 12, 2009)
 Geninho (July 13, 2009 – Dec 28, 2009)
 Guilherme Macuglia (Dec 28, 2009 – April 1, 2010)
 Alexandre Gallo (April 2, 2010 – Sept 29, 2010)
 Roberto Fernandes (Oct 1, 2010 – May 2, 2011)
 Waldemar Lemos (May 3, 2011 – April 8, 2012)
 Alexandre Gallo (April 18, 2012 – Jan 31, 2013)
 Vágner Mancini (Feb 3, 2013 – April 7, 2013)
 Silas (April 12, 2013 – June 2, 2013)
 Zé Teodoro (June 17, 2013 – Aug 15, 2013)
 Jorginho (2013)
 Levi Gomes (2013)
 Marcelo Martelotte (2013)
 Lisca (2014)
 Sidney Moraes (2014)
 Dado Cavalcanti (2014)
 Moacir Júnior (2015)
 Lisca (2015)
 Gilmar Dal Pozzo (2015–16)
 Alexandre Gallo (2016–)
 Givanildo Oliveira (2016)
 Dado Cavalcanti (2017)
 Milton Cruz (2017)
 Waldemar Lemos (2017)
 Beto Campos (2017)
 Roberto Fernandes (2017-2018) 
 Márcio Goiano (2018–)

References

External links
Official site

Clube Náutico Capibaribe
Association football clubs established in 1901
Nautico
1901 establishments in Brazil
Campeonato Brasileiro Série C winners